Slavery and the Making of America is a 2004 PBS four-part documentary series on African American slaves and their contributions to the United States. Famous African Americans such as Colonel Tye and historical figures such as President George Washington and John Murray are all documented in the series. The series covers Black Loyalists and Black Patriots.

Emmy Award winning composer Michael Whalen wrote the film's original soundtrack.

References 

American documentary television films
African-American genealogy
PBS original programming
Documentary films about African Americans
Documentary films about slavery in the United States